Kim Hilding Bergstrand (born 18 April 1968) is a Swedish football coach. A former player for Stockholm rivals AIK and Hammarby IF, he is the manager of the Allsvenskan team Djurgårdens IF together with Thomas Lagerlöf.

Career

Playing career 
Bergstrand played for AIK, Hammarby IF, Nacka FF and IF Brommapojkarna. He became Swedish champion by winning 1992 Mästerskapsserien with AIK.

Managerial career 
Between 2008 and 2010, Kim Bergstrand was the manager of IF Brommapojkarna. In 2012, Kim Bergstrand and Thomas Lagerlöf became managers of IK Sirius.

Before the 2019 season, Kim Bergstrand and Thomas Lagerlöf became managers of Djurgårdens IF. Bergstrand and Lagerlöf managed the team to a Swedish title their first season. In 2022, they took Djurgården to their first European group stage, the 2022–23 UEFA Europa Conference League.

Controversies 
On 31 January 2021, Kim Bergstrand participated in an interview about leadership in Swedish newspaper Aftonbladet, where he referred to German leadership during the 1930s and 1940s as something you "can learn from". The statement received strong criticism, including from the Swedish Committee Against Antisemitism. Kim Bergstand immediately apologized in public for his statement and Djurgården adopted, as the first Swedish professional club, the IHRA definition of antisemitism in its policy documents.

Honours

Player 
AIK
 Swedish Champion: 1992

Manager 
Djurgårdens IF
 Allsvenskan: 2019

References

Kim Bergstrand's history at AIK's official website

1968 births
Living people
People from Täby Municipality
Swedish footballers
Association football forwards
AIK Fotboll players
Hammarby Fotboll players
Allsvenskan players
Superettan players
IF Brommapojkarna players
Swedish football managers
IF Brommapojkarna managers
IK Sirius Fotboll managers
Boo FK players
Boo FK managers
Sportspeople from Stockholm County